This is a list of seasons played by FC Basel in Swiss and European football, from the club's founding in 1893 to the present. It details FC Basel's record in each major competition entered including different divisions of the Swiss Football League, the Swiss Cup, the Swiss League Cup, the Inter-Cities Fairs Cup, and various UEFA competitions. Although the first season of Swiss football occurred in 1897–98, FC Basel did not take part until the following season in 1898–99. The club did not compete the next season, but has participated in every season since 1900–01. The club won its first major trophy in 1932–33, when it won the Swiss Cup, and its first Swiss league title in 1952–53. To date FC Basel have won 20 league titles, 13 Swiss Cups, and 1 Swiss League Cup.

League names 
From its inception in the 1897–98 season to the 1932–33 season, the Swiss Championship (known originally as "Serie A", then "1st League", then "Nationalliga") consisted of teams playing in regional groups, followed by either a play-off match of the top 2 teams, or a championship play-off group involving the top several teams. The 1932–33 season also contained an intermediate championship called the "Challenge National" where the teams in each of the 2 groups played the teams in the other group, followed by a play-off match between the group winners. In 1933–34, the different regional groups were combined into a single league to determine the championship, and this league format has been maintained until the present. However, it was not until the 1944–45 season that the 2nd division of Swiss football was similarly organised, with the adoption of the names "Nationalliga A" and "Nationalliga B" for the top 2 divisions. Since 2003–04 these divisions have been known as the "Swiss Super League" and the "Swiss Challenge League" respectively.

Seasons

Key 

 Pld = Matches played
 W = Matches won
 D = Matches drawn
 L = Matches lost
 GF = Goals for
 GA = Goals against
 Pts = Points
 Pos = Final position

 F = Finals
 GS = Group stage
 GS2 = Second group stage
 Prelim = Preliminary round
 POR = Play-off round
 QF = Quarter-finals
 QR1 = First qualifying round
 QR2 = Second qualifying round
 QR3 = Third qualifying round

 R1 = Round 1
 R2 = Round 2
 R3 = Round 3
 R4 = Round 4
 R5 = Round 5
 Rof32 = Round of 32
 Rof16 = Round of 16
 SF = Semi-finals

†Text in bold italics indicates FC Basel was promoted in addition to being Champion of the division.

References